Joel Coustrain (born 22 January 1996) is an Irish professional footballer who plays for Treaty United in the League of Ireland First Division.

Club career
Born in Limerick, Coustrain first played with Corbally United in Limerick and signed for the Sheffield United F.C. Academy in 2013. In 2015 Coustrain signed a pro contract with Sheffield United. In 2016 Coustrain moved to Scottish club Raith Rovers on a free transfer. Coustrain made six appearances for Raith during the 2016/17 season, but was released from his contract in March 2017.

He signed for League of Ireland First Division club Athlone Town ahead of the 2020 season.

On 27 February 2021, it was announced that Coustrain had signed for newly formed club Treaty United in his hometown of Limerick ahead of their 2021 League of Ireland First Division campaign, their first ever season in football. Coustrain had the honour of scoring the club's first ever goal in their first ever match, a 1–1 draw with Waterford in a pre-season friendly on 2 March 2021.

International career
He was capped by the Republic of Ireland with their under-16, under-18 and under-19 teams.

Timeline 
 2003: Signs for Aishling Annacotty FC
 2021: Signs for Treaty United
 2020: Signs for Athlone Town
 2019: July, Plays in two UEFA Europa match's for Cork City v Progres Niederkorn
 2019: July, Transfers to Cork City on loan deal
 2019: Signs 2-year contract with Shamrock Rovers
 2018: Plays in 2 UEFA Europa League Qualifiers for Shamrock Rovers.
 2018: Signed for Shamrock Rovers Dublin, Ireland
 2016: Signed for Raith Rovers
 2016: Holds 14 Junior Irish caps while playing for Ireland in different age groups.
 2015: In the European U19's qualifiers scored for Ireland against Germany and Slovakia.
 2015: Called up for Irish U19's
 2015: Signed his 2nd year pro contract with Sheffield United
 2014: Called up for Irish U18's
 2014: Signed his 1st 1 year pro contract with Sheffield United
 2012: Signed with Sheffield United's academy for 2 years
 In April 2012 scored a hat trick for Ireland U16's against Belgium.
 2014: Called up for Irish U19's
 2012: Called up for Irish U16's
 2011: Called up for Irish U15's

Personal life 
Coustrain was born in Limerick, Ireland and grew up in Ardnacrusha, County Clare. Coustrain attended primary school at the national school in Parteen and secondary at Villiers, Limerick.

References

External links 
 
 Profile Page at Shamrock Rovers
 
 Raith Rovers team list
 Hibernia Trophy

1996 births
Republic of Ireland association footballers
Living people
Raith Rovers F.C. players
League of Ireland players
Shamrock Rovers F.C. players
Cork City F.C. players
Athlone Town A.F.C. players
Treaty United F.C. players
Scottish Professional Football League players
Sheffield United F.C. players
Association football wingers